Tause, also known as Doa or Darha, is a poorly-known Papuan language of Indonesia spoken by approximately 500 people, mainly in Derapos village.

The Tause only made contact with the outside world in 1982.

The Tause language has been widely reported to be related to the neighboring Lakes Plain languages; however, this conclusion is based on little evidence. Ross (2005) placed Tause in his East Bird's Head – Sentani family, along with another language isolate and two small families, but this was motivated more by an attempt to spark further research than an actual claim of relationship. Usher (2018) classifies it as the most divergent of the West Lakes Plain languages.

References

Languages of western New Guinea
West Lakes Plain languages
Unclassified languages of New Guinea